Donna Rose Addis is a New Zealand psychology academic. Of Samoan descent, she is currently a full professor at the University of Auckland, but is set to move to the University of Toronto.

Academic career
Addis went to Aorere College in Auckland, and her bursary marks made her New Zealand's top all-round scholar of Pacific Island descent.

After an undergraduate at the University of Auckland Addis won a commonwealth scholarship to the University of Toronto for a PhD titled  'Terms of engagement: investigating the engagement of the hippocampus and related structures during autobiographical memory retrieval in healthy individuals and temporal lobe epilepsy patients'  and a post-doctoral fellowship at Harvard University. She then returned to Auckland and rose to full professor in 2016.

Addis's research is on memory, future thinking, depression brain scans, and related areas.

In 2009 Addis won a Prime Minister's Science Prize.

In 2017 Addis was made a Fellow of the Royal Society of New Zealand.

Selected works 
 Schacter, Daniel L., Donna Rose Addis, and Randy L. Buckner. "Remembering the past to imagine the future: the prospective brain." Nature Reviews Neuroscience 8, no. 9 (2007): 657–661.
 Addis, Donna Rose, Alana T. Wong, and Daniel L. Schacter. "Remembering the past and imagining the future: common and distinct neural substrates during event construction and elaboration." Neuropsychologia 45, no. 7 (2007): 1363–1377.
 Schacter, Daniel L., and Donna Rose Addis. "The cognitive neuroscience of constructive memory: remembering the past and imagining the future." Philosophical transactions of the Royal Society B: biological sciences 362, no. 1481 (2007): 773–786.
 Moscovitch, Morris, R. Shayna Rosenbaum, Asaf Gilboa, Donna Rose Addis, Robyn Westmacott, Cheryl Grady, Mary Pat McAndrews et al. "Functional neuroanatomy of remote episodic, semantic and spatial memory: a unified account based on multiple trace theory." Journal of Anatomy 207, no. 1 (2005): 35–66.
 Schacter, Daniel L., Donna Rose Addis, and Randy L. Buckner. "Episodic simulation of future events." Annals of the New York Academy of Sciences 1124, no. 1 (2008): 39–60.

References

External links
 
 academia
 institutional homepage

Living people
New Zealand women academics
Academic staff of the University of Toronto
University of Toronto alumni
Academic staff of the University of Auckland
University of Auckland alumni
Samoan academics
New Zealand psychologists
New Zealand women psychologists
Year of birth missing (living people)
Fellows of the Royal Society of New Zealand
People educated at Aorere College
New Zealand people of Samoan descent
21st-century New Zealand women writers